Iris to Iris is the fifth studio album by Christian rock band Building 429, which was released on May 1, 2007 through Word Records. This recording is the band's third full-length major label recording. A digital single for the album track, "Grace That Is Greater", was released through iTunes on March 6, 2007.

Track listing

Personnel 
Building 429
 Jason Roy – lead and backing vocals, guitars 
 Jesse Garcia – keyboards, guitars, backing vocals 
 Michael Anderson – drums 

Additional musicians
 Blair Masters – keyboards, programming 
 Otto Price – bass 
 Eric Darken – percussion 

Production

 Brown Bannister – producer, engineer 
 Otto Price – executive producer, A&R 
 Steve Bishir – recording, mixing 
 Michael Anderson – engineer 
 George Cocchini – engineer 
 Aaron Sternke – engineer 
 Bill Whittington – engineer 
 F. Reid Shippen – mixing 
 Buckley Miller – mix assistant 
 Natthaphol Abhigantaphad – mix assistant 
 Stephen Marcussen – mastering 
 Katherine Petillo – creative direction
 Thomas Petillo – photography 
 Amber Lehman – wardrobe

References

Building 429 albums
2007 albums